Johan Asker (22 April 1915 – 14 December 2000) was a Swedish equestrian. He competed in two events at the 1956 Summer Olympics.

References

External links
 

1915 births
2000 deaths
Swedish male equestrians
Olympic equestrians of Sweden
Equestrians at the 1956 Summer Olympics
Sportspeople from Saint Petersburg